This is a list of Members of Parliament (MPs) elected in the 1880 general election, held from March to April 1880.



Notes and references

See also
UK general election, 1880
List of parliaments of the United Kingdom

1880
1880 United Kingdom general election
 List
UK MPs